An anti-roll bar (roll bar, anti-sway bar, sway bar, stabilizer bar) is a part of many automobile suspensions that helps reduce the body roll of a vehicle during fast cornering or over road irregularities. It connects opposite (left/right) wheels together through short lever arms linked by a torsion spring. An anti-roll bar increases the suspension's roll stiffness—its resistance to roll in turns—independent of its spring rate in the vertical direction. The first stabilizer bar patent was awarded to Canadian inventor Stephen Coleman of Fredericton, New Brunswick on April 22, 1919.

Anti-roll bars were unusual on pre-WW2 cars due to the generally much stiffer suspension and acceptance of body roll. From the 1950s on, however, production cars were more commonly fitted with anti-roll bars, especially those vehicles with softer coil spring suspension.

Purpose and operation

An anti-sway or anti-roll bar is intended to force each side of the vehicle to lower, or rise, to similar heights, to reduce the sideways tilting (roll) of the vehicle on curves, sharp corners, or large bumps. With the bar removed, a vehicle's wheels can tilt away by much larger distances, as shown in the SUV image at right. Although there are many variations in design, a common function is to force the opposite wheel's shock absorber, spring, or suspension rod to lower or rise to a similar level as the other wheel.

In a fast turn, a vehicle tends to drop closer onto the outer wheels, and the anti-roll bar soon forces the opposite wheel to also get closer to the vehicle. As a result, the vehicle tends to "hug" the road closer in a fast turn, where all wheels are closer to the body. After the fast turn, then the downward pressure is reduced, and the paired wheels can return to their normal height against the vehicle, kept at similar levels by the connecting anti-roll bar.

Because each pair of wheels is cross-connected by a bar, the combined operation causes all wheels to generally offset the separate tilting of the others and the vehicle tends to remain level against the general slope of the terrain.

Principles
An anti-roll bar is usually a torsion spring that resists body roll motions. It is usually constructed out of a cylindrical steel bar, formed into a "U" shape, that connects to the body at two points, and at the left and right sides of the suspension. If the left and right wheels move together, the bar rotates about its mounting points. If the wheels move relative to each other, the bar is subjected to torsion and forced to twist. Each end of the bar is connected to an end link through a flexible joint. The anti-roll bar end link connects in turn to a spot near a wheel or axle, transferring forces from a heavily loaded axle to the opposite side.

Forces are therefore transferred:
 from the heavily loaded axle
 to the connected end link via a bushing
 to the anti-sway (torsion) bar via a flexible joint
 to the connected end link on the opposite side of the vehicle
 to the opposite axle.

The bar resists the torsion through its stiffness. The stiffness of an anti-roll bar is proportional to the stiffness of the material, the fourth power of its radius, and the inverse of the length of the lever arms (i.e., the shorter the lever arm, the stiffer the bar). Stiffness is also related to the geometry of the mounting points and the rigidity of the bar's mounting points. The stiffer the bar, the more force required to move the left and right wheels relative to each other. This increases the amount of force required to make the body roll.

In a turn the sprung mass of the vehicle's body produces a lateral force at the centre of gravity (CG), proportional to lateral acceleration. Because the CG is usually not on the roll axis, the lateral force creates a moment about the roll axis that tends to roll the body. (The roll axis is a line that joins the front and rear roll centers). The moment is called the roll couple.

Roll couple is resisted by the suspension roll stiffness, which is a function of the spring rate of the vehicle's springs and of the anti-roll bars, if any. The use of anti-roll bars allows designers to reduce roll without making the suspension's springs stiffer in the vertical plane, which allows improved body control with less compromise of ride quality.

One effect of body (frame) lean, for typical suspension geometry, is positive camber of the wheels on the outside of the turn and negative on the inside, which reduces their cornering grip (especially with cross ply tires).

Main functions 
Anti-roll bars provide two main functions. The first function is the reduction of body lean. The reduction of body lean is dependent on the total roll stiffness of the vehicle. Increasing the total roll stiffness of a vehicle does not change the steady state total load (weight) transfer from the inside wheels to the outside wheels, it only reduces body lean. The total lateral load transfer is determined by the CG height and track width.

The other function of anti-roll bars is to tune the handling balance of a car. Understeer or oversteer behavior can be tuned out by changing the proportion of the total roll stiffness that comes from the front and rear axles. Increasing the proportion of roll stiffness at the front increases the proportion of the total load transfer that the front axle reacts to—and decreases the proportion that the rear axle reacts to. In general, this makes the outer front wheel run at a comparatively higher slip angle, and the outer rear wheel to run at a comparatively lower slip angle, which is an understeer effect. Increasing the proportion of roll stiffness at the rear axle has the opposite effect and decreases understeer.

Drawbacks
Because an anti-roll bar connects wheels on opposite sides of the vehicle, the bar transmits the force of a bump on one wheel to the opposite wheel. On rough or broken pavement, anti-roll bars can produce jarring, side-to-side body motions (a "waddling" sensation), which increase in severity with the diameter and stiffness of the anti-roll bars. Other suspension techniques can delay or dampen this effect of the connecting bar.

Excessive roll stiffness, typically achieved by configuring an anti-roll bar too aggressively, can make the inside wheels lift off the ground during hard cornering. This can be used to advantage: many front wheel drive production cars lift a rear wheel when cornering hard in order to overload the opposite wheel, limiting understeer.

Adjustable bars

Some anti-roll bars, particularly those intended for use in auto racing, are externally adjustable while the car is in the pit whereas some systems can be adjusted in real time by the driver from inside the car, such as in Super GT. This allows the stiffness to be altered, for example by increasing or reducing the length of the lever arms on some systems, or by rotating a flat lever arm from a stiff edge-on position to a more flexible flat-side-on position on other systems. This lets a mechanic tune the roll stiffness for different situations without replacing the entire bar.

MacPherson struts 
The MacPherson strut is a common form of strut suspension. This was not the first attempt at strut suspension, but in MacPherson's original patent, the anti-roll bar forms an integral and essential part of the suspension, in addition to its usual function in controlling body roll. A strut suspension like MacPherson's requires a hinged lower member between the chassis and wheel hub to control the wheel position both inwards and outwards (controlling the track), and also forwards and backwards. This may be provided by a wishbone with a number of joints, or by using an additional radius rod. MacPherson's design replaced the wishbone with a simpler and cheaper track control arm, with a single inboard joint, to control the track. Forward and backward position was controlled through the anti-roll bar. Overall this required a simpler and cheaper set of suspension members than with wishbones, also allowing a reduction in unsprung weight.

As the anti-roll bar is required to control wheel position, the bars of a MacPherson strut suspension may be connected through ball joints. However many later "MacPherson strut" suspensions have reverted to using wishbones rather than the simplified track control arm of the original design.

Semi active anti-roll bars

Various methods of decoupling the anti-roll bar have been proposed. The first production car to use an active anti-roll bar was the 1988 Mitsubishi Mirage Cyborg. The "Dual Mode Suspension" equipped with the 16-v turbo model has front active anti-roll bar that has a hydraulic actuator built in the anti-roll bar link. The actuator can be operated with a switch on the dash board, changing the effectiveness of the anti-roll bar between the sport mode and touring mode. The Jeep Wrangler (JK, JL) and Jeep Gladiator (JT) also have a switchable decoupler on Rubicon models, to increase wheel articulation for off-roading.

Active systems

The first car to use an active anti-roll bar in 1994 was the Citroën Xantia Activa, a medium-sized sedan sold in Europe. The SC.CAR (Systeme Citroën de Contrôle Actif du Roulis) system featured an anti-roll bar that could be stiffened under the command of the suspension ECU during hard cornering. The car rolled a maximum of 2 degrees.

In 2001 the BMW 7 Series (E65) introduced Active Roll Stabilization (ARS) "active" anti-roll bars that can be proportionally controlled automatically by a suspension-control computer, reducing body lean in turns while improving rough-road ride quality.

In 2006 Toyota introduced its Active Stabilizer Suspension System. By altering anti-roll bar stiffness, this system acts to reduce body tilt during cornering, keeping the vehicle more level during turns and improving handling, as opposed to the natural tendency of a vehicle to roll due to the lateral forces experienced during high-speed maneuvering. The active stabilizer system relies on vehicle body sensors and electric motors. The first production usage of this system was introduced in August 2005 with the Lexus GS430 sport sedan.

Porsche Cayenne introduced Porsche Dynamic Chassis Control (PDCC), a system with active roll-bars in 2007 (on European market).

In 2011, the third generation Mercedes-Benz M-Class introduced a similar system: ACTIVE CURVE SYSTEM.

Range Rover Sport introduced Dynamic Response active anti-roll bars.

Mercedes-Benz S-Class Active Body Control system uses another approach: the computer uses sensors to detect lateral load, lateral force, and height difference in the suspension strut, then uses hydraulic pressure to raise or lower the spring to counter roll. This system removes the anti-roll bar. Most active roll control systems allow a small degree of roll to give a more natural feel.

Toyota also uses a mechanical system called Kinetic Dynamic Suspension System (KDSS) that essentially disengages the stabilizer bars when off-road, allowing for greater vehicle articulation and ride quality.

See also
Panhard rod
Torsion bar suspension

References

Canadian inventions
Automotive suspension technologies
Automotive safety technologies
Auto parts
Mechanical power control